Ernst-Reuter-Platz is a town square in Charlottenburg, Berlin, Germany. It is named after Ernst Reuter, mayor of West Berlin from 1948–1953.

Squares in Berlin
Charlottenburg